Beelbi Creek is a rural locality in the Fraser Coast Region, Queensland, Australia.

Geography
Beelbi Creek (the watercourse) flows through the locality from south to north.

References 

Fraser Coast Region
Localities in Queensland